James Joyce's The Dead is a Broadway musical by Richard Nelson and Shaun Davey based upon James Joyce's short story "The Dead".

Productions
The musical was originally presented Off-Broadway at Playwrights Horizons, starting on October 1, 1999. The opening night cast included Blair Brown, Paddy Croft, Brian Davies, Daisy Eagan, Dashiell Eaves, Sally Ann Howes, John Kelly, Brooke Sunny Moriber, Marni Nixon, Alice Ripley, Emily Skinner, Stephen Spinella and Christopher Walken. Musical direction was by Charles Prince, with music co-ordination and percussion by Tom Partington. It transferred to the Belasco Theatre on Broadway on January 11, 2000, where it completed a run of 120 performances before closing on April 16, 2000.

The musical ran at the Kennedy Center (Washington, D.C.), from October 14, 2000 to November 12, 2000, with Faith Prince and Stephen Bogardus as Greta and Gabriel Conroy. The musical had played an earlier engagement at the Ahmanson Theatre in Los Angeles from July 11, 2000 to September 3, 2000.

Songs
Sourceplaybillvault

 Killarney's Lakes – Mary Jane Morkan, Aunt Kate Morkan and Rita
 Kate Kearney – Michael, Mary Jane Morkan and Company
 Parnell's Plight – Miss Molly Ivors, Michael, Gabriel Conroy, Gretta Conroy and Company
 Adieu to Ballyshannon – Gabriel Conroy and Gretta Conroy
 When Lovely Lady – Aunt Julia Morkan and Aunt Kate Morkan
 Three Jolly Pigeons – Freddy Malins, Mr. Browne and Company
 Goldenhair – Gretta Conroy and Gabriel Conroy
 Three Graces – Gabriel Conroy and Company
 Naughty Girls – Aunt Julia Morkan, Aunt Kate Morkan, Mary Jane Morkan and Company
 Wake the Dead – Freddy Malins and Company
 D'Arcy's Aria – Bartell D'Arcy
 Queen of Our Hearts – Mr. Browne, Freddy Malins, Gabriel Conroy, Bartell D'Arcy and Michael
 When Lovely Lady (Reprise) – Young Julia Morkan and Aunt Julia Morkan
 Michael Furey – Gretta Conroy
 The Living and the Dead – Gabriel Conroy and Company

Awards and nominations

Original Broadway production
Source playbillvault

References

External links
 
 Brantley, Ben, "A Musical That's Willing to Be Quiet", The New York Times, October 29, 1999

2000 musicals
Broadway musicals
Music relating to James Joyce
Musicals based on short fiction
Tony Award-winning musicals